Dietrich Braess (born 16 June 1938) is a German mathematician. He is known for Braess's paradox, which deals with traffic equilibrium. Braess' focus has centered on numerical treatment of elliptical differential equations and nonlinear approximation theories.

References

External links 
 

1938 births
Living people
20th-century German mathematicians
21st-century German mathematicians